Streptomyces aureorectus is a bacterium species from the genus of Streptomyces which has been isolated from soil in Russia. Streptomyces aureorectus produces aurenin.

See also 
 List of Streptomyces species

References

Further reading

External links
Type strain of Streptomyces aureorectus at BacDive -  the Bacterial Diversity Metadatabase

aureorectus
Bacteria described in 1986